Daaibooi is a beach on the Caribbean island of Curaçao, located close to the village of Sint Willibrordus, a 30 minutes drive to the north-west of Willemstad. The beach is in a secluded bay, surrounded by cliffs. The loggerhead sea turtle is known to nestle here. The beach is used as a starting point for scuba diving. There is a basic restaurant.

References
Daaibooi Beach

Beaches of Curaçao